La Grange is a settlement on the island of Saint Croix in the United States Virgin Islands.

History
In the Danish West Indies colonial era, La Grange was the name of a sugar plantation. In 1894, it was acquired by Gustav Adolph Hagemann, chief technical officer of De Danske Sukkerfabrikker, who immediately modernized the operations. He also acquired the sugar plantations Prosperity, Williams, Wheel of Fortune and Punch⊋

References

Populated places in Saint Croix, U.S. Virgin Islands